Bolak is a constructed language that was invented by Léon Bollack. The name of the language means both "blue language" and "ingenious creation" in the language itself.

History
Bollack wrote three books on this language: La Langue Bleue Bolak: langue internationale pratique (1899), Abridged Grammar of the Blue Language (1900) and Premier vocabulaire de la langue bleue Bolak (1902).

Bollack caught the attention of H.G. Wells, who wrote in A Modern Utopia:
The language of Utopia will no doubt be one and indivisible; all mankind will, in the measure of their individual differences in quality, be brought into the same phase, into a common resonance of thought, but the language they will speak will still be a living tongue, an animated system of imperfections, which every individual man will infinitesimally modify. Through the universal freedom of exchange and movement, the developing change in its general spirit will be a world-wide change; that is the quality of its universality. I fancy it will be a coalesced language, a synthesis of many. Such a language as English is a coalesced language; it is a coalescence of Anglo-Saxon and Norman French and Scholar's Latin, welded into one speech more ample and more powerful and beautiful than either. The Utopian tongue might well present a more spacious coalescence, and hold in the frame of such an uninflected or slightly inflected idiom as English already presents, a profuse vocabulary into which have been cast a dozen once separate tongues, superposed and then welded together through bilingual and trilingual compromises. [Footnote: Vide an excellent article, La Langue Française en l'an 2003, par Leon Bollack, in La Revue, 15 Juillet, 1903.] In the past ingenious men have speculated on the inquiry, "Which language will survive?" The question was badly put. I think now that this wedding and survival of several in a common offspring is a far more probable thing.

Despite the attention of Wells and money invested by Bollack, the language gained no adherents, and Bollack went on to support Ido, according to Otto Jespersen, writing in 1912 in The History of our Language about a conference that had taken place in 1907:
The inventors of language systems had been invited to attend either in person or by representative to defend their systems. This offer was availed of by Dr. Nicolas (Spokil), Mr. Spitzer (Parla) and Mr. Bollack (La langue bleue); moreover Dr. Zamenhof got himself represented by Mr. de Beaufront, who had been propagating Esperanto for many years; and almost as representative of Neutral came Mr. Monseur, professor of comparative philology in Brussels: yet his plea had the character less of a positive defence of Neutral than of a zealous and expert insistence on the weaknesses of Esperanto. Of the discussions with those outside the committee two episodes deserve special mention: Dr. Nicolas emphasised as an advantage of his system founded on "a priori" principles, that it was constructed in accordance with a firm grasp of the laws of mnemonics and therefore was especially easy to remember. Yet he was almost offended when I wished to begin examining him about his own dictionary, and so it appeared that he could not remember the words which he himself had made. Mr. Bollack in a very elegant discourse presented his Langue bleue for the diffusion of which he had devoted a great deal of money; he ended by declaring that although he wished naturally that his language should be adopted, he would nevertheless accept the verdict of the committee of experts if it went otherwise; this promise he has kept loyally by being now an eminent member of the Ido organization in Paris.

Alphabet and pronunciation
Bolak uses a modified Latin alphabet with 19 letters:

A, B, Ч, D, E, F, G, I, K, L, M, N, O, P, R, S, T, U, V.

Ч is taken from Cyrillic and has the sound of English ch. Other letters are pronounced as in French.

Grammar
Bolak is a mixed language, whose grammar is mostly a priori while the vocabulary  is a posteriori. It is also an agglutinative language, much like Esperanto but while Esperanto uses agglutination mainly logically, Bolak uses it mainly emotionally.

Examples
The Lord's Prayer:
Nea per ev seri in sil!
Vea nom eч santigui! Vea regn eч komi!
Vea vil eч makui in sil, so ib gev!
Ev givi nea pan taged ana!
Ev solvi nae fansu so ne solvo aчe re ufanso na!
Eч seri siч!

The numbers 1–10:
ven, dov, ter, far, kel, gab, чep, lok, nif, dis.

What an immense advantage for mankind, if from people to people we could communicate through the same language!
Ak vop sfermed pro spes maned, if om pobl to pobl, ne ei mnoka pfo an am lank!

An international language is the most important tool for the development of any social progress. 
An lank transed seri psil ifkased pro flep ad at ksek skosmed.

Encoding

Bibliography
La Langue Bleue Bolak: langue internationale pratique, Paris: 1899 (480+ p.).
Abridged grammar of the Blue Language [translated by Tischer], Paris: Pres. Dupont, 1900 (64 p.).
Premier vocabulaire de la langue bleue Bolak, Paris: 1902 (90+ p.).

References

External links

 Bolak Manual on Langmaker.com
 Bolak Grammar on Archive.org

Agglutinative languages
Constructed languages
International auxiliary languages
Constructed languages introduced in the 1890s
1899 introductions